Nikolai was a schooner of the Russian-American Company sent by Chief Manager Alexander Baranov to  Oregon Country in November 1808. During a storm she ran aground on the Olympic Peninsula and the crew had to abandon ship. 

The crew quickly faced hostilities from the Hoh nation, wary of outside invaders. The crew had low food supplies and had to raid to native villages over the next year to avoid starvation. Many became the willing slaves of the Makah nation after Makah nobles agreed to free them when the next European vessel entered the Strait of Juan de Fuca. An American ship visited Neah Bay in the spring of 1810 and the RAC employees were freed and returned to Novo-Arkhangelsk. The failure of the vessel to locate a suitable location for a potential station in the Oregon Country made RAC officials refocus efforts and eventually establish Fort Ross in Alta California.

The schooner was named in honor of Saint Nicholas; it is sometimes referred to as Sv. Nikolai.

Dispatched south
Nikolai was "ordered to explore the coast south of Vancouver Island, barter with the natives for sea otter pelts, and if possible discover a site for a permanent Russian post in the Oregon Country." The vessel had a complement of 22, including Russian promyshlenniki, an Englishman and seven Alutiiq. On , a gale with large waves stranded the ship on a beach north of the Quillayute River and James Island. Members of the Hoh nation arrived that day, inspecting the stranded ship. As the Hohs investigated the Russian property, Timofei Tarakanov, an officer, instructed the promyshlenniki to "Try somehow to get them out of the camp without fighting." 

Communication with a Hoh noble was commenced through Chinook jargon, though a Russian-instigated skirmish arose. Three Hohs were killed, and many of the Nikolai crew were injured by rocks and spears. In the aftermath of the fighting, the promyshlenniki "took two guns and a pistol, and we loaded all the boxes of cartridges, three kegs of powder" along with the remaining supply of provisions and destroyed the remaining armaments aboard the ship. The party then began to leave the area for a location that Baranov had said a RAC ship would eventually visit.

Crew marooned

The group was continually monitored by Hoh scouts as they traveled along the coast north. On  they reached the Hoh river mouth,  from the wreck site. The principal Hoh village was adjacent to the riverbank opposite of the Nikolai crew. Two canoes ferried a portion of the crew the next day. The larger vessel was intentionally sunk by Hoh canoemen in the middle of the Hoh river. The seven Russians on the canoe swam back to the bank where the remaining group was. Another battle ensued, with one Russian receiving a fatal wound from a spear. 

The Hoh kept the four passengers on the other canoe, two Alaska Natives, one of the promyshlenniki, and Anna Bulygina, the 18-year-old wife of expedition commander Nikolai Bulygin, as hostages. After this incident the free Nikolai staff began to aimlessly wander through the coastal forests. In despair from losing his wife, Bulygin appointed Tarakanov to lead the remaining party. The lodges were abandoned outside of one teenager, who informed them of the inhabitants fleeing upon becoming aware of their presence. "Each of us grabbed twenty-five fish in bundles" Tarakanov later reported, and an estimated 25 native warriors tracked down the men soon after. While none of the crew were grievously injured in the ensuing fight, it pushed them into the interior.

Another small village was eventually located, though the locals were not receptive to offering the large amount of supplies needed by the party. Tarakanov said that "we had every right not only to take from their countrymen by force what we needed for our lives... we showed a spirit of magnanimity by not wanting to inflict on them any great physical harm." Natives were forced to accept a commercial transaction. In return for glass and metal beads, they traded bags of salmon and roe. The crew continued to search for a suitable location to create a cabin to weather the winter season. Eventually a small group of natives visited the shelter and the Russians took the son of a noble captive. The Russians demanded 400 salmon and 10 bags of roe for his release. 

A band of 70 natives during the next week delivered the provisions along with a canoe, with the Russians in return giving the noble several trinkets of clothing as a measure of goodwill. Bulygin resumed command of the party and they departed from the cabin on 8 February 1809. The party was led by a local to a river where individuals connected to the seizure of four party previous members were sighted. Two natives were taken hostage and the Sv. Nikolai crew demanded the return of their people. The Russians were informed that a neighboring chieftain had purchased the four people, but relatives of the native hostages agreed to work for their return.

Enslaved
A week later a band of 50 Makah arrived, with Anna Bulygina with them. Anna stated that while she was a slave, Yutramaki, her owner, "was an upright and virtuous man, widely known along the coast. He honestly would set us free and send us to the two European ships cruising along the Straits of Juan de Fuca." The majority of the group agreed to become slaves, and were traded among nobles in several villages. The remaining party members were soon after forcibly enslaved by natives. Over the winter of 1809–1810 several promyshlenniki fled their masters for Yutramaki as they faced starvation. 

The Makah noble initially refused to return the Russians, but Tarakanov made their owners agree to better feed them. On  1810 an American merchant vessel, Lydia, visited Yutramakai's village on Neah Bay. On board was a Russian from Nikolai, having previously been resold south along the Columbia River. Lydia departed for New Archangel and arrived there on 9 June.

During their time marooned on the Olympic Peninsula, seven of the crew, including the Bulygins, died.

Assessment
When Tarakanov and the remaining crew returned to Novo-Arkhangelsk, his report to Baranov was influential in determining future company operations. The inhospitable picture given by Tarakanov led to future expansion efforts focused on Alta California, with Fort Ross founded in 1812. As historian Alton S. Donnelly reported, Tarakanov and his shipmates had not found a good harbor. They did not discover rich, untapped fur resources. Nor did they meet any Indian nations eager to do the Russians' bidding as clients of the Company... The Voyage of the Sv. Nikolai... could not reveal the fertile, open farmlands of the interior country [like the Willamette Valley]... Neither Baranov nor his successors took any further real interest in the Oregon Country after 1810."

References

Schooners
Nikolai
Nikolai
History of the Pacific Northwest
Oregon Country
Pre-statehood history of Washington (state)
Russian America
Maritime incidents in 1808
Shipwrecks of the Washington coast
1808 in North America
1809 in North America
1810 in North America